Hannah Cohen is the name of:
 Hannah Cohen (singer) (born 1986), American singer and model
Hannah Cohen (philanthropist) (1875–1946), English civil servant and philanthropist